Man on a String is a 1960 American spy thriller directed by Andre DeToth and starring Ernest Borgnine and Kerwin Mathews. It was the last film that DeToth directed in the United States.

Plot
A government intelligence agency in Washington, D.C. wants agent Frank Sanford to follow Boris Mitrov, a film producer who appears to also be a Russian spy. Helen and Adrian Benson, a wealthy American couple with a home in Beverly Hills and a film studio, are communist sympathizers as well, in league with Colonel Vadja Kubelov, the top KGB man in the U.S.

Boris's office is bugged by his assistant, Bob Avery, a plant who is working for the Americans. Now that he has been caught red-handed, Boris is willing to turn double agent, going to Berlin under the pretense of making a documentary film there.

Helen is having an affair with Kubelov, but the Bensons' home has been bugged and they try to flee to Mexico. In the meantime, Boris is sent to Moscow to be entrusted with a new assignment, so Avery gives him a code word ("cinerama") to use should he find himself in danger.

Upon learning that Adrian intends to publicly expose Boris and Kubelov, Avery is able to alert Boris to return to Germany as soon as possible. A checkpoint is closed, but Boris shoots a police officer and escapes safely to West Berlin, only to end up in a fight for his life with a Russian assassin.

Cast
 Ernest Borgnine as Boris Mitrov
 Kerwin Mathews as Bob Avery
 Colleen Dewhurst as Helen Benson
 Alexander Scourby as Vadja Kubelov
 Glenn Corbett as Frank Sanford
 Vladimir Sokoloff as Papa 
 Friedrich Joloff as Nikolai Chapayev
 Richard Kendrick as Inspector Jenkins 
 Ed Prentiss as Adrian Benson
 Clete Roberts as Narrator

Home media
Man on a String was released on DVD by Sony Pictures Home Entertainment on March 4, 2011 via its DVD-on-demand system available through Amazon.

See also
 List of American films of 1960

References

External links

1960 films
1960s crime thriller films
American black-and-white films
American crime thriller films
American spy thriller films
Cold War spy films
Columbia Pictures films
1960s English-language films
Film noir
Films scored by George Duning
Films based on non-fiction books
Films directed by Andre DeToth
Films set in East Germany
Films set in West Germany
1960s American films